Tradescantia is a genus of 85 species of herbaceous perennial wildflowers in the family Commelinaceae, native to the Americas from southern Canada to northern Argentina, including the West Indies. Members of the genus are known by many common names, including inchplant, wandering jew, spiderwort, and dayflower. 

Tradescantia grow , and are commonly found individually or in clumps in wooded areas and open fields. They were introduced into Europe as ornamental plants in the 17th century and are now grown in many parts of the world. Some species have become naturalized in regions of Europe, Asia, Africa, and Australia, and on some oceanic islands.

The genus's many species are of interest to cytogenetics because of evolutionary changes in the structure and number of their chromosomes. They have also been used as bioindicators for the detection of environmental mutagens. Some species have become pests to cultivated crops and considered invasive.

Description
Tradescantia are herbaceous perennials and include both climbing and trailing species, reaching  in height. The flowers can be white, pink, purple or blue, with three petals and six yellow anthers (or rarely, four petals and eight anthers). The sap is mucilaginous and clear. 

A number of species have flowers that last for only a day, opening in the morning and closing by the evening.

Etymology
The scientific name of the genus chosen by Carl Linnaeus honours the English naturalists and explorers John Tradescant the Elder (c. 1570s – 1638) and John Tradescant the Younger (1608–1662), who introduced many new plants to English gardens. Tradescant the Younger mounted three expeditions to the new colony of Virginia. From there the type species, Tradescantia virginiana, was brought to England in 1629.

Plants of the genus are called by many common names, varying by region and country. The name "inchplant" is thought to describe the plant's fast growth, or the fact that leaves are an inch apart on the stem. "Spiderwort" refers to the sap which dries into web-like threads when a stem is cut.  The name "dayflower", shared with other members of the Commelinaceae family, refers to the flowers which open and close within a single day.

The controversial name "wandering Jew" originates from the Christian myth of the Wandering Jew, condemned to wander the earth for taunting Jesus on the way to his crucifixion. In recent years there have been efforts to stop using this and other potentially offensive common names, in favour of alternatives such as "wandering dude".

In Spanish, Tradescantia plants are sometimes referred to as flor de Santa Lucía (Saint Lucy's flower), in reference to the Saint's reputation as the patron saint of sight, and the use of the juice of the plant as eye drops to relieve congestion.

Taxonomy

Subdivisions and species

The number of species and infrageneric taxa has changed throughout history. The first major classification proposed by Hunt (1980) included 60 species divided into eight sections, with one section divided into a further four series. Hunt's 1986 revision united several small genera with Tradescantia as sections, resulting in a total of twelve sections comprising 68 species, and this infrageneric classification was accepted for several decades.

A recent study by Pellegrini (2017) proposed a new classification based on recent morphological research, dividing the genus into five subgenera. The Royal Botanic Gardens, Kew currently recognises 85 species.

Formerly placed here
 Tradescantia × andersoniana W.Ludw. & Rohweder The name was published with no description, so is not a valid botanical name; the taxon is now treated as a cultivar group.
Callisia navicularis (Ortgies) D.R.Hunt (as T. navicularis Ortgies)
Callisia warszewicziana (Kunth & C.D.Bouché) D.R.Hunt (as T. warszewicziana Kunth & C.D.Bouché)
Gibasis geniculata (Jacq.) Rohweder (as T. geniculata Jacq.)
Gibasis karwinskyana (Schult. & Schult.f.) Rohweder (as T. karwinskyana Schult. & Schult.f.)
Gibasis pellucida (M.Martens & Galeotti) D.R.Hunt (as T. pellucida M.Martens & Galeotti)
Siderasis fuscata (Lodd. et al.) H.E.Moore (as T. fuscata Lodd. et al.)
Tinantia anomala (Torr.) C.B.Clarke (as T. anomala Torr.)
Tripogandra diuretica (Mart.) Handlos (as T. diuretica Mart.)
 Elasis hirsuta (Kunth) D.R.Hunt (as T. hirsuta)

Distribution and habitat
The first species described, the Virginia spiderwort, T. virginiana, is native to the eastern United States from Maine to Alabama, and Canada in southern Ontario. Virginia spiderwort was introduced to Europe in 1629, where it is cultivated as a garden flower.

The natural range of the genus as a whole spans nearly the entire length and width of mainland North America, from Canada through Mexico and Central America, and thrives in a great diversity of temperate and tropical habitats. It is frequently found in thinly wooded deciduous forests, plains, prairies, and healthy fields, often alongside other native wildflowers.

Conservation
The western spiderwort T. occidentalis is listed as an endangered species in Canada, where the northernmost populations of the species are found at a few sites in southern Saskatchewan, Manitoba and Alberta; it is more common further south in the United States to Texas and Arizona.

Cultivation

Spiderworts are popular in Europe and North America as ornamental plants. Temperate species are grown as garden plants while tropical species, such as T. zebrina and T. spathacea, are used as house plants. Their popularity and easy spreading nature has led to some species being considered serious weeds in certain places (see below).

Most cold-hardy garden plants belong to the Andersoniana Group (often referred to with the invalid name Tradescantia × andersoniana). This is a group of interspecific hybrids developed from Tradescantia virginiana, T. ohiensis, and T. subaspera, which have overlapping ranges within continental North America. These plants are clump-forming herbaceous perennials, with individual cultivars mainly differing in flower colour. The cultivars in this group include 'Blue Stone', 'Isis', 'Innocence', 'Snowcap', 'Osprey', 'Iris Pritchard', 'Pauline', 'Red Cloud' and 'Karminglut' ('Carmine Glow'). 'Caerulea Plena' is a double-flowered variety with dark blue flowers. 'Concord Grape' (Andersoniana Group) has won the Royal Horticultural Society's Award of Garden Merit.

A wide range of tender tropical species are cultivated as houseplants or outdoor annuals, including Tradescantia zebrina, T. fluminensis, T. spathacea, T. sillamontana, and T. pallida. They are typically grown for their foliage, and many have colourful variegated patterns of silver, purple, green, pink, and gold. Popular tropical cultivars include T. zebrina 'Silver Plus', T. zebrina 'Burgundy', T. fluminensis 'Lavender', T. fluminensis 'Variegata', T. mundula 'Laekenensis', T. pallida 'Purple Heart', Tradescantia 'Nanouk', and Tradescantia 'Pale Puma'. The species Tradescantia zebrina, and the cultivars Tradescantia 'Quicksilver' and Tradescantia pallida 'Purpurea' have received the Royal Horticultural Society's Award of Garden Merit.

Weeds
Due to its ready propagation from stem fragments and its domination of the ground layer in many forest environments, T. fluminensis has become a major environmental weed in Australia, New Zealand and the southern United States. Other species considered invasive weeds in certain places include T. pallida, T. spathacea, and T. zebrina.

Toxicity
Some members of the genus Tradescantia may cause allergic reactions in pets (especially cats and dogs) characterised by red, itchy skin. Notable culprits include T. albiflora (scurvy weed), T. spathacea (Moses in the cradle), and T. pallida (purple heart).

Uses
Native Americans used T. virginiana to treat a number of conditions, including stomachache. It was also used as a food source. The cells of the stamen hairs of some Tradescantia are colored blue, but when exposed to sources of ionizing radiation such as gamma rays or pollutants like sulphur dioxide from industries, the cells mutate and change color to pink; they are one of the few tissues known to serve as an effective bioassay for ambient radiation levels.

Gallery

References

Bibliography

External links

 
 
Flora of North America: Tradescantia (includes species in USA and Canada only)
PlantSystematics: Tradescantia
Western Spiderwort endangered in Canada

 
Commelinales genera